Velankanni may refer to:

Velankanni Town, a pilgrim town near Nagapattinam in the Indian state of Tamil Nadu
Our Lady of Good Health, or Velankanni Matha an apparition attributed to Mary, mother of Jesus
Basilica of Our Lady of Good Health, a shrine in the town of Velankanni
Annai Velankanni, 1971 Indian film